The Toqui Formation is a geological formation in the Aysén Region of southern Chile. It has been dated to the Tithonian stage of the Late Jurassic by uranium–lead dating of zircons, providing an age of 147 ± 0.1 Ma. It consists of an sequence of clastic sedimentary sandstones and conglomerates, interbedded with volcanic tuffs and ignimbrite. The dinosaurs Chilesaurus and indeterminate diplodocids and the mesoeucrocodylian Burkesuchus are known from the formation. The formation was deposited in a fluvio-deltaic environment.

Paleobiota of the Toqui Formation

Crocodylomorphs

Dinosaurs

See also 
 Geology of Chile
 Tobífera Formation

References

External links
 

Geologic formations of Chile
Jurassic paleontological sites
Mesozoic paleontological sites of South America
Fossiliferous stratigraphic units of South America
Jurassic System of South America
Late Jurassic South America
Jurassic Chile
Tithonian Stage
Conglomerate formations
Sandstone formations
Tuff formations
Deltaic deposits
Fluvial deposits
Formations
Paleontology in Chile
Geology of Aysén Region